Maghihintay Pa Rin (International title: Bitter Sweet Life / ) is a 2013 Philippine television drama romance series broadcast by GMA Network. Directed by Don Michael Perez, it stars Bianca King, Rafael Rosell and Dion Ignacio. It premiered on June 10, 2013 on the network's Afternoon Prime line up replacing Bukod Kang Pinagpala. The series concluded on September 27, 2013 with a total of 79 episodes. It was replaced by Magkano Ba ang Pag-ibig? in its timeslot.

Cast and characters

Lead cast
 Bianca King as Geneva "Gen" de Villa
 Rafael Rosell as Francisco "Kiko" Sebastian
 Dion Ignacio as Orlando "Orly" Ramirez

Supporting cast
 JC Tiuseco as Ricky Alvarado
 Tanya Gomez as Trinidad Sebastian
 Julie Lee as Grace Lim
 JM Reyes as Cholo Sebastian
 Daniella Amable as Lita Sebastian
 Sachi Manahan as Sebastian
 Diva Montelaba as Milan
 Lou Sison as Leni
 Bryan Pagala as Francisco "Franz" de Villa Sebastian Jr.
 Ynez Veneracion as Stella Ramirez
 Nathalie Hart as Yvette Chua-Villafuerte
 AJ Dee as Lance Villafuerte
 Ayen Munji-Laurel as Catriona "Rio" de Villa

Production and development
Conceptualized by Richard Cruz and developed by Kit Villanueva-Langit, the project—which initially titled as Hindi Kita Iiwan was put on the fast track by the network for a second week of June 2013 premiere. On the mid-part of April 2013, a detailed breakdown of the script was released, containing information on the plot and characters which would be in the series. It also revealed the names of two of the three actors chosen for the lead roles. However, during the casting process of the show, several revisions were made.

Executive producer, Darling Pulido-Torres described the show a reminiscent of William Shakespeare's Romeo and Juliet, but not a "stereotypical romance". She also added that the series is especially dedicated for the Overseas Filipino Workers (OFWs) around the world.

Bianca King and Dion Ignacio were personally chosen by the network management to portray the lead characters and were the first two actors to be cast. King was signed on to play Geneva de Villa, a Richie-rich young lass "who will do everything in the name of love." King summarized her character as being intelligent, brave and compassionate – far from the usual "damsel in distress" roles she portrayed in her past projects.

Production began on the mid-part of May 2013. Most of the scenes were shot on location in Quezon City. They also filmed several scenes (good for two-week episodes) in Singapore. Filming locations were chosen by the series' director Don Michael Perez and by production designer Melvin Lacerna.

Ratings
According to AGB Nielsen Philippines' Mega Manila household television ratings, the pilot episode of Maghihintay Pa Rin earned an 11.7% rating. While the final episode scored a 14.4% rating.

References

External links
 

2013 Philippine television series debuts
2013 Philippine television series endings
Filipino-language television shows
GMA Network drama series
Philippine romance television series
Television shows set in Quezon City
Television shows filmed in Singapore